Damon Gray (born in Belen, New Mexico) is an American country music singer. Gray was 16 years old when he began his professional career. He moved to Nashville in August 1989.

Gray was the first artist signed to Broken Bow Records, who released his debut album, Lookin' for Trouble, in February 2000. Its first single, "I'm Lookin' for Trouble", peaked at number 75 on the Billboard Hot Country Singles & Tracks chart. The album received a mixed review from Chet Flippo of Billboard, who wrote that "despite a certain unevenness here, Gray shows considerable potential, which is probably due to the many different configurations of five different producers who worked on the album."

Discography

Albums

Singles

Music videos

References

American country singer-songwriters
American male singer-songwriters
BBR Music Group artists
Living people
Singers from New Mexico
People from Belen, New Mexico
Musicians from Nashville, Tennessee
Year of birth missing (living people)
Singer-songwriters from Tennessee
Songwriters from New Mexico
Country musicians from Tennessee